Francis Charron (born August 22, 1983) is a Canadian ice hockey referee.

Refereeing career
Charron began his career as a linesman for the Quebec Major Junior Hockey League in 2002 before moving up to a referee in 2003.

Charron officiated Games 1, 4, and 7 of the 2009 ECHL Kelly Cup Finals. On August 25, 2009, Charron was signed by the National Hockey League (NHL). He made his NHL debut on April 5, 2010, officiating a match-up between the Columbus Blue Jackets and St. Louis Blues.

References

External links
NHL Officials profile

1983 births
Living people
Ice hockey people from Gatineau
National Hockey League officials